Ida Moore (March 1, 1882 – September 26, 1964) was an American film and television actress.

Early life
Moore was born in Altoona, Kansas, she was the daughter of Mr. and Mrs. Marvelton Moore.

Career
Moore's first professional work had her singing to accompany silent films. She then toured England and South Africa entertaining with a partner. After she returned to the United States, she performed in road companies of plays, including Street Scene. Just before she could make a screen test for Paramount Pictures, her mother became sick, causing Moore to return to Columbus, Ohio, where she ran a restaurant for her mother and acted in amateur productions. She returned to Hollywood after her mother died. She also worked on television programs, including a 1958 episode of Alfred Hitchcock Presents titled "Bull in a China Shop".

Death
She died in Los Angeles,  California, aged 82, on September 26, 1964. She is interred in Oakwood Memorial Park Cemetery in Los Angeles County, California.

Selected filmography

The Ghost That Walks Alone (1944)
She's a Soldier Too (1944)
The Soul of a Monster
The Town Went Wild
Her Lucky Night 
Girls of the Big House 
To Each His Own 
The Bride Wore Boots 
The Dark Mirror
The Show-Off
It's a Joke, Son!
Easy Come, Easy Go
Good Sam 
The Egg and I 
Money Madness 
Return of the Bad Men 
Johnny Belinda 
The Sun Comes Up
Manhattan Angel 
Ma and Pa Kettle 
Hold That Baby! 
The Story of Molly X 
Paid in Full 
Backfire 
Fancy Pants 
Let's Dance 
Mr. Music 
The Lemon Drop Kid 
Comin' Round the Mountain 
Leave It to the Marines 
Bannerline
Honeychile 
Scandal Sheet 
Just This Once 
Scandal at Scourie 
Desk Set 
Rock-A-Bye Baby

References

External links

 
 

1882 births
1964 deaths
20th-century American actresses
American film actresses